The Nur Ashki Jerrahi Sufi Order is a contemporary Sufi Order based in New York City and México City. It is a descendent of the 18th century Jerrahi Order of Istanbul and was founded in the early 1980s by American Sufis Nur al-Anwar al-Jerrahi and Fariha Fatima al-Jerrahi after they received direct transmission from their spiritual guide Muzaffer Özak Âșkî al-Jerrahi, the Grand Sheikh of the Jerrahi Order from 1966 until his passing in 1985. Sheikh Muzaffer Özak was the 19th successor of the founding saint Hazreti Pîr Muhammad Nureddin al-Jerrahi (1678-1720).

General
The Nur Ashki Jerrahi Order is a tariqa of dervishes based at their Sufi lodges the Dergah al-Farah in downtown Manhattan, the Mezquita María de la Luz in México City, as well as in various lodges throughout the U.S. and worldwide. In the hospitable spirit of Sufi Islam, the community "joyfully welcome into our gatherings students of all sacred paths and sincere seekers of any personal orientation."

After its establishment, the Order swiftly embraced seekers and initiates in the United States and Latin America. When Sheikh Nur al-Anwar passed in 1995, Sheikha Fariha Fatima al-Jerrahi of New York and Sheikha Amina Teslima al-Jerrahi of México  succeeded him as leaders of the Nur Ashki Jerrahi Order. The Dergah al-Farah is located at 245 West Broadway in Tribeca. Feisal Abdul Rauf served as Imam of Dergah al-Farah from 1983 to 2009. He is one of the people behind the Cordoba Initiative.

Ten Principles 
 We are a Sufi Islamic Community open to all seekers and devotees.
 We belong to a mystical lineage transmitted heart to heart and centered around a living guide.
 Our spiritual mode is that of joy and praise, while our inner gaze is focused on the seamless unity of Reality.
 Our core is the living Source of Being whose essence is love and absolute mercy.
 We follow the universal sacred path revealed through the Prophet Muhammad, may he be showered in sublime peace, which is the essential light of guidance revealed to all the Prophets throughout time.
 We envision all sacred traditions as a single field of divine revelation and we resonate in universal friendship with their communities.
 We follow the universal wisdom of the Holy Qur’an as interpreted by the great mystic saints of Sufism, and we are enriched by the wisdom teachings and practices of other sacred traditions.
 We emphasize companionship rather than hierarchy. We practice spiritual parity and gender equality. We seek to build a community based on the divine teaching of “those who love each other for My sake”.
 We rely on the heart to heart transmission of light, love and knowledge to nourish and further each person in their spiritual maturing.
 We recognize the arising of the New Humanity of spiritual consciousness.

Sufi Books 
In New York City, dervishes of the order run a bookstore called Sufi Books, where they carry a large selection of books on Sufism and mysticism from Pir Press, the publishing house also run by the order. Published authors included are Lex Hixon, Muzaffer Ozak, Ibn Arabi, Rabia of Basra, Al-Hujwiri, and Attar.

Locations

The Nur Ashki Jerrahi Order has Dervish communities in the following locations:

New York City
Mexico City
Albuquerque, NM
Atlanta, GA
Boulder, CO
Chicago, IL
Crestone, CO
Honolulu, HI
Kansas City, MO
Lansing, MI
Las Vegas, NM
Minneapolis, MN
Nashville, TN
Oakland, CA
Orange County, CA
Portland, OR
Washington, DC
Liverpool, England
Illawarra, Australia
Cuernavaca, Morelos
Oaxaca, Oaxaca
Singapore

References

External links
 www.nurashkijerrahi.org The official website of the Nur Ashki Jerrahi Sufi Order.
 www.pirpress.com The official website of Pir Press.
 www.sufibooks.com The official website of the Sufi Books: World Mystical Traditions Bookstore, in New York City.

Sufism in the United States
Sufi orders